Duvivier (or du Vivier) is a French surname. Notable people with the surname include:

Aimée Duvivier (1766-?), French painter
François du Pont Duvivier (1676–1714), French navy captain who served in Acadia
François Dupont Duvivier (1705–1776),  Acadian-born merchant and officer of the French colonial troupes de la marine
George Duvivier (1920–1985),  American jazz double-bass player
Jean Duvivier (1687–1761), French medallist
Jean-Bernard Duvivier (1762–1837), painter and drawer of historical and religious subjects and portraits
Julien Duvivier (1896–1967), French film director
Marthe Duvivier (1850–?), French opera singer
Pierre-Simon-Benjamin Duvivier (1730–1819), French engraver of coins and medals
Paul Duvivier (1869–1956), French journalist

French toponymic surnames
French-language surnames